The Past Is a Foreign Land is a 2008 Italian neo-noir film directed by Daniele Vicari. It is based on the novel with the same name written by Gianrico Carofiglio, who also collaborated to the screenplay. It entered the competition at the 2008 Rome International Film Festival, in which Michele Riondino was awarded best actor.

Plot    
Bari: Giorgio, a classic good guy and a law graduate, feels a bit out of place in circles he frequented with his girlfriend. During an elegant Christmas party he defends a stranger, Francesco, with whom he forms a solid friendship that introduces him to a world totally unknown to him, that of gambling - poker, in this case -, in which the two play couple cheating. The new experiences inebriate Giorgio and drag him into situations much greater than him.

The boy is progressively engulfed by a whirlwind of illegality and immorality: he regularly visits the house of a married woman, buys a luxurious car with the proceeds of poker and reacts violently to the questions of his parents, who worry more and more. One day Francesco informs him of his imminent departure for Spain; Giorgio decides to follow him despite discovering, with an initial repulsion soon overwhelmed by excitement, that his friend intends to devote himself to the cocaine trade. In Barcelona, the two come to live increasingly wild experiences, leading to sexual violence against a young bartender.

After returning to Bari, Francesco becomes nowhere to be found. One night Giorgio tracks him down as he leaves a club; shortly after Francesco chases the bartender who works there, Antonia, and attacks her. The friend intervenes, a fight arises and the carabinieri arrive. After being beaten to death, Giorgio is released because the girl testified on his behalf. He also claims to the commander that he only vaguely knows Francesco, with whom the young man catches a last glance through a window - he too was beaten to death by the carabinieri -, leaving the barracks.

Some time later, Giorgio is an established lawyer; after an audience Antonia approaches him to thank him for having saved her the night of the attempted violence. Without speaking, Giorgio watches her go.

Cast 
 Elio Germano: Giorgio
 Michele Riondino: Francesco
 Chiara Caselli: Maria
 Valentina Lodovini: Antonia
 Marco Baliani: Franco
 Daniela Poggi: Anna 
 María Jurado: Ángela
 Romina Carrisi: Giulia
 Lorenza Indovina: Alessandra

See also   
 List of Italian films of 2008

References

External links

2008 films
Italian drama films
2008 drama films
Italian neo-noir films
Films directed by Daniele Vicari
2000s Italian films
Fandango (Italian company) films